Bannerman Clarke is a fictional character created by David Wellington. He originally appeared in Monster Nation and later Frostbite. He is a Captain in the Colorado Army National Guard. He is notable for having appeared in Frostbite though the two are apparently different fictional universes (he apparently died in Monster Nation), and for the "Bannerman Lives" campaign by a group of Wellington fans.

Monster Nation 
Monster Nation tells of the American military response to the early weeks of a zombie apocalypse. Clarke is called in to assess the emerging crisis. He is instrumental in bringing Nilla, the story's other main protagonist, face-to-face with the source of the zombie plague. In the process, he suffers a presumably mortal injury, impaled on the wreckage of a downed helicopter.

His death, however, is never made explicit; the chapter ends with a zombie closing in on the immobilized Clarke, who wonders if he will be able to dispatch the creature (a former friend) before dying himself. The openness of this ending is responsible for the "Bannerman Lives" campaign among some Wellington fans.

Frostbite 
In contrast to Monster Nation, Clarke is only a minor character in Frostbite, acting as a support character to the protagonist, his niece, Cheyenne. That this is a separate fictional universe is apparent, as the world in Frostbite has not suffered the zombie plague of the Monster trilogy.

Personality 
Clarke is portrayed in both stories as a dedicated and disciplined military officer. He is also shown to be a man of honor, with a genuine belief in the duty of the strong to protect the weak (and of those who can become strong to do so). Before being convinced of the nature of the zombie plague, he is sickened at the idea that he was ordering soldiers to fire on what he believed to be civilians who were merely sick.

The "Bannerman Lives!" Campaign 
Due to the popularity of the Bannerman Clarke character among readers of Monster Island, and the implicit nature of his apparent death, several Wellington fans began to express hopes of his survival in the comments of the online serialization of it and its sequel, Monster Planet. This became a meme among some Wellington fans, and hope eventually became partly replaced by dogged insistence—in spite of Wellington's own indications that, yes, Clarke was indeed dead.

Over time, and especially after the opening of Wellington's Hail Horrors! discussion forum, this meme seems to have taken on two main forms of expression. The first is the simple insertion of "Bannerman Lives!" and similar slogans in posts. The second is continued discussion of how exactly Bannerman Clarke will figure into any ongoing Wellington work, as if it were a foregone conclusion that such would happen, even if it has already been determined that the story exists in an entirely separate fictional universe.

This continued even after, in Monster Planet, Nilla discovered a zombie in military uniform impaled on the wreckage of a crashed helicopter in the location of Bannerman's fatal crash—clearly Bannerman, and explicitly stated as such by Wellington. The subsequent appearance of the character in Frostbite was taken by many as vindication of their faith.

Fictional characters from Colorado
Fictional military captains
Fictional United States Army personnel